Lockport Township is located in Will County, Illinois. As of the 2010 census, its population was 60,010 and it contained 22,016 housing units.

Geography

Cities, Towns, Villages
 Crest Hill (vast majority)
 Joliet (small portion)
 Lockport (vast majority)
 Romeoville (half)

Other Communites
 Bonnie Brae
 Crystal Lawns (small portion)
 Fairmont

Demographics

Academic Institutions 
 Lockport Township High School

References

External links
City-data.com: Lockport Township, Illinois
Official Will County, Illinois website
Illinois State Archives: Will County

Townships in Will County, Illinois
Lockport, Illinois
1849 establishments in Illinois
Populated places established in 1849
Townships in Illinois